Sandøya is an island in Ålesund Municipality in Møre og Romsdal county, Norway. The  island was the namesake of the former Sandøy municipality. The island has ferry connections to Finnøya, Ona, and Orta. The historic Sandøy Church is located on this island.

See also
List of islands of Norway

References

Ålesund
Islands of Møre og Romsdal